The following are battle victories by Canadians in different wars. According to the below list, Canadian victories are French victories prior to the British Conquest of Quebec (1759). Prior to this conquest, any victories by the British in Nova Scotia (even after the Conquest of Acadia in 1710) and aboriginal victories over the colonial empires are not considered Canadian victories (e.g., see aboriginal victories in Father Le Loutre's War).

17th century 

Iroquois War (1609)
Iroquois Wars (1666)
Hudson Bay expedition (1686)
Battle of Fort Albany
Battle of Quebec (1690)
Battle of La Prairie
Capture of York Factory
Battle of Fundy Bay
Siege of Pemaquid (1696)
Avalon Peninsula Campaign
Battle of Hudson's Bay

18th century 

Northeast Coast Campaign (1703)
Raid on Deerfield
Battle at Port-la-Joye
Battle of Grand Pré
Battle of Fort Necessity
Braddock's Expedition
Battle of the Monongahela
Battle of Petitcodiac
Battle of Fort Bull
Battle of Fort Oswego (1756)
Battle on Snowshoes (1757)
Battle on Snowshoes (1758)
Battle of Fort William Henry
Battle of Carillon
Battle of Fort Duquesne
Battle of Beauport
Battle of Sainte-Foy
Battle of Quebec (1775)
Battle of Fort Cumberland
Battle of Trois-Rivières
Battle of Machias (1777)
 Defeat of the Penobscot Expedition
Naval battle off Halifax

19th century 

Battle of Fort Dearborn
Battle of Mackinac Island (1812)
Siege of Fort Mackinac
Siege of Detroit
Battle of Queenston Heights
Battle of Lacolle Mills (1812)
Battle of Frenchtown
Battle of Ogdensburg
Battle of Chateauguay
Battle of Beaver Dam
Battle of Cook's Mills
Battle of Crysler's Farm
Battle of Stoney Creek
Battle of Mackinac Island
Battle of Lacolle Mills (1814)
 Battle of Hampden
Battle of Prairie du Chien
Battle of Saint-Denis (1837)
Battle of the Windmill
Battle of Windsor
Short Hills Raid
Battle of Eccles Hill
Battle of Loon Lake

20th century 

Battle of Kitcheners' Wood (during the Second Battle of Ypres)
Battle of Flers-Courcelette
Capture of the Regina Trench during the Somme Offensive (1916)
Battle of Vimy Ridge during the 1917 Battle of Arras
Battle of Passchendaele
Second Battle of Passchendaele
Battle of Amiens (1918)
Battle of Cambrai (1918)
Allied Invasion of Italy
Juno Beach
Battle for Caen
Falaise Pocket
Battle of Verrières Ridge
Battle of the St. Lawrence
Battle of Ortona
Operation Fusilade – unopposed taking of Dieppe in September 1944
Battle of the Rhineland
Operation Veritable – the Allied units of the First Canadian Army clearing the west bank of the Rhine of German troops
Battle of the Scheldt

See also 

List of Canadian military operations
List of conflicts in Canada
List of Canadian Peacekeeping Missions
Bibliography of Canadian military history

References